John Christmas may refer to:
 John Christmas (sea captain) (1757–1822), English-born Danish sea captain
 John Christmas (1799–1873), Danish naval officer, son of the above, and governor general of the Danish West Indies in 1871
 John Christmas (banker) (born 1969), United States banker and head of the Latvian Parex Bank's International Relations in the early 2000s
 John Christmas Beckwith (1759–1809), English organist and composer
 John Christmas Møller (1894–1948), Danish politician, leader of The Conservative People's Party between 1928 and 1947
 Johnny Christmas (born 1982), American lacrosse player

See also 
 Finding John Christmas, 2003 American film directed by Andy Wolk